The Hurlingham Academy (formerly Hurlingham and Chelsea School) is an 11–16 mixed secondary school with academy status in Fulham, London, England. It was formerly a community school and adopted its current name after converting to an academy on 1 January 2015. It became part of the United Learning Trust.

History
The school's original buildings were constructed in 1956 by Sheppard Robson & Partners for the London County Council. It opened in 1956 and originally housed the 500 girls of Hurlingham School from Hugon Road in Fulham. The school became a mixed school in 1982 when it merged with a boys’ school called Chelsea School, which doesn't or never has is related to Fulham Boys' School. The school was one of nine schools in the London Borough of Hammersmith and Fulham serving secondary aged children, of which there are three academies, three foundation schools, one voluntary-aided school, one free school, with Hurlingham and Chelsea being the sole community school.

The school has had a turbulent history. It was described as a "failing school" in the pilot Ofsted inspections in 1994, which prompted discussions of closure until it was given a clean bill of health later in the same year. Provision was judged ‘good’ by Ofsted in 1997 and the school was highlighted for its improvement in HMCI's 1999 Annual Report. Because results were consistently below government floor targets, however, the school was designated as a "school facing challenging circumstances" in 2003. In March 2004 the school was placed under special measures. In November 2005, the school emerged from special measures. A proposal to close the school was made in September 2006, which was later withdrawn in April 2007.

In January 2008, the school was highlighted as the most improved school in London (for the proportion of students achieving at least 7 A*–C grades at GCSE) and in July 2015 was judged to be ‘Outstanding’ by Ofsted. The federation with Sulivan Primary School was established in February 2012 to raise standards in both schools through collaborative work and to provide for the first time the prospect of an enhanced and integrated educational, youth and community provision across the Sands End ward. In 2005, Ofsted reported that the school was rapidly improving. In October 2006, the Local Authority proposed to close the school, but the school campaigned against this, and before adjudication, the council withdrew the proposal. In 2009, the school was given appropriations to expand and improve its facilities and to consider adding a sixth form.

In 2014, the United Learning Trust sponsored the former  Hurlingham and Chelsea School, which resulted in the school reopening as "The Hurlingham Academy" in January 2015.

Headteachers

Notable alumni
 Carole Caplin, health and wellbeing consultant
 Lauren Mahon, BBC Radio presenter, British cancer activist and founder of Girls vs Cancer.

References

External links
 

Secondary schools in the London Borough of Hammersmith and Fulham
Academies in the London Borough of Hammersmith and Fulham
United Learning schools
Educational institutions established in 1956
1956 establishments in England